Boston baked beans are a variety of baked beans, sweetened with molasses, and flavored with salt pork or bacon.

History
Native Americans had made corn bread and baked beans. The Pilgrims at Plymouth Colony learned these recipes in the early 1620s and likely added barley to the corn meal to invent New England brown bread. The triangular trade of slaves in the 18th century helped to make Boston an exporter of rum, which is produced by the distillation of fermented molasses. At that time, molasses was added to local baked bean recipes, creating a distinctive style of baked beans unique to New England. 

In colonial New England, baked beans were traditionally cooked on Saturdays and left in brick ovens overnight. On Sundays, the beans were still hot, allowing people to indulge in a hot meal and still comply with Sabbath restrictions. Brown bread and baked beans along with frankfurters continue to be a popular Saturday night staple throughout the region.

Regional varieties 
The region has two main styles of baked beans: Boston baked beans and Maine baked beans. The difference between the two styles is that Boston beans are made with small white navy beans or pea beans with thin skin while Maine beans are made with native bean varieties with thicker skins.  The varieties used in Maine are Marafax, soldier, and the most popular baked bean variety in Maine is the yellow-eye.

Both varieties are often made with salt pork or bacon. However, there is also a long tradition of vegetarian baked beans made with the same recipe as Boston baked beans or Maine baked beans but made without the addition of salt pork or bacon.

Legacy

Boston is often referred to as “Beantown” in reference to the popular dish. From 1883 to 1906 the National League baseball team in Boston was known as the Boston Beaneaters. An annual tournament between the ice hockey teams of four Boston-area universities is named the Beanpot.

See also
 List of regional dishes of the United States
 Original Boston Baked Beans, a candy by the Ferrara Candy Company

References

Massachusetts cuisine
Baked beans
American legume dishes